Artemis Fowl and the Opal Deception, known in America as Artemis Fowl: The Opal Deception, is a teen fantasy novel published in 2005, the 4th book in the Artemis Fowl series by the Irish author Eoin Colfer. Preceded by Artemis Fowl: The Eternity Code and followed by Artemis Fowl: The Lost Colony, it is centred on the brilliant pixie Opal Koboi's second try at rebellion (after her first attempt was a failure) and Artemis Fowl II and his fairy comrades' efforts to stop her. Critical reception was mixed, with some reviews praising the book and others deeming its writing poor and confusing.

Plot
The book begins with the pixie Opal Koboi faking a coma inside a hospital to avoid incarceration by the Lower Elements Police (LEP) after her failed rebellion and attempt of world domination (which took place in Artemis Fowl and the Arctic Incident).

Opal Koboi, who had been under 24-hour surveillance, had DNA tests done every 4 hours, a seeker-sleeper planted in her arm (a device that can make the criminal faint, while also giving their position away) and had her in a net trapped with monitoring pads by the LEP to ensure that Opal was actually in the asylum cell, with help from the Brill Brothers Opal manages to replace herself with a clone, which is identical to herself (the only difference being that the clone is brain dead which is also the current state the sensors detect Opal's coma-like mind to be in).

Opal lures Commander Julius Root and Captain Holly Short of the LEP into a lava chute alone by putting General Scalene under the mesmer there. Koboi then kills Commander Root by using a 30-centimeter metal box packed with explosive gel and covered in stealth ore (framing Captain Holly Short as the murderer, she told Holly that if she shot a certain part of the exploding box, it would turn off (it only went faster), since stealth ore couldn't be picked up by any electronics the LEP cameras only saw Holly shooting the commander, clear as day), and launches a bio-bomb at Artemis Fowl, which fails to kill him and his bodyguard Domovoi Butler because Butler grabbed Artemis and jumps from the three-story hotel, using a mattress to cushion the fall.

Artemis Fowl was mindwiped in the third book of the series, Artemis Fowl and the Eternity Code and has no memory of meeting the fairies. This has also caused him to revert to his former self - the one cruel enough to kidnap a fairy. But he has a conscience that he chooses not to listen to.

Artemis is rescued from the scene of the bio-bomb attack by Holly. She tells him who she is, in hopes to ignite his memory. He does not regain his memories of the past adventures but agrees to help her for a fee. They are then recaptured by Koboi and thrown into a troll-infested abandoned fairy theme park known as the "Eleven Wonders of the Human World" (containing scale-models not only of the Seven Wonders of the Ancient World but also the additions of Abu Simbel, Borobodur, Rapa Nui and the Throne Hall at Persepolis). After a desperate battle against the troll hordes on a model of the Temple of Artemis at Ephesus, they are rescued by former criminal Mulch Diggums and Butler. Holly and Artemis become friends "bonded by trauma" and Artemis says he feels that he doesn't need money to help a friend.

Opal then proceeds with her plan to help renowned Italian billionaire environmentalist Giovanni Zito send a probe downward by mesmerising him that she is his pampered adopted daughter Belinda Zito, which, according to Koboi's plan, will cause the humans to find the fairies and start an inter-species war, leading to fairy genocide.

After being rescued, Mulch gives Artemis the disk that had been passed off as a gold medallion, which Butler was given earlier in the book. Artemis views the disk and regains his memories. He is overcome with the guilt of what he had done to the fairies but to Holly the most and for the first time, he apologizes for kidnapping her. He realizes that Holly, Butler, and Mulch were the only friends he had. Together, the four friends take on Opal Koboi, knowing that they are the only ones that know she's escaped. It becomes a more difficult task with the LEP on their tail, who still thinks Holly is the one who killed the Commander. The new Commander refuses to believe anything, despite the fact that everyone knows Root was like a father to Holly.

Afterwards, the story follows the struggle over the probe, which is closing in on the E7 chute. The probe eventually misses the chute, and Koboi crashes into a woman's vine field. She uses her last bits of magic to mesmerize the woman that she is Belinda, her child. However, a week later, Koboi is detained by the LEP, and Holly is cleared of all charges over Commander Root's murder. However, she is frustrated by Commander Root's replacement, Ark Sool, so she resigns and starts a private investigation firm with Mulch Diggums.

It is also apparent that Artemis has had a change of heart, as he anonymously donates the famed painting The Fairy Thief, which he had stolen directly before Koboi's bio-bomb attack, to the Louvre museum.

The Tongue
There is a secret code at the bottom of the book, containing a message from Foaly. This is translatable if one has the Gnommish alphabet, available in The Artemis Fowl Files by Eoin Colfer, or the Artemis Fowl website.

The message on the cover of the US publication, barely decipherable, reads "Opal wants revenge", it is faintly repeated several times on the sides of the tube.

The Gnommish symbols around the molecules on the front cover read "DNA never lies".

Critical reception
The book received generally mixed reviews. Entertainment Weekly noted that the characters were "still a blast", however, the review also said "Colfer seems too dazzled by all the gadgetry and explosives jammed into this tale." Disney's Family.com called the book "pretty confusing", though said it still retained the strengths of the series as a whole. The School Library Journal wrote that "the prose is clunky", however, it continued to say that the "creativity carry the narrative through the tight spots and impossible situations."

References

2005 Irish novels
2005 fantasy novels
Science fantasy novels
Opal Deception
2005 children's books
Novels about cloning
Heist fiction
Puffin Books books